Pusula pediculus, common name the "coffee bean trivia", is a species of small sea snail, a marine gastropod mollusk in the family Triviidae, the false cowries or trivias. This species was previously known as Trivia pediculus.

Distribution

Description 
The maximum recorded shell length is 22 mm.

Habitat 
The minimum recorded depth for this species is 0 m; maximum recorded depth is 129 m.

References

Triviidae
Gastropods described in 1758
Taxa named by Carl Linnaeus